The Aididae are a family of moths in the superfamily Zygaenoidea.

References

Zygaenoidea
Moth families